Golondrinas ("The Swallows") is an unincorporated community in Mora County, New Mexico, United States, on State Route 161 next to the Mora River, approximately  south of the town of Mora.

Golondrinas was founded in 1835 as one of the villages in the  Mora land grant and from 1851-1891 supplied Fort Union with produce.

In the center of the village is the adobe church San Acacio de las Golondrinas  which was built in 1862. Golondrinas has never had its own post office, but its ZIP code is 87712.

Notes

References
 Julyan, Robert Hixson (1998) "Golondrinas" The place names of New Mexico (2nd ed.) University of New Mexico Press, Albuquerque, NM, p. 151, 

Unincorporated communities in New Mexico
Unincorporated communities in Mora County, New Mexico
Populated places established in 1835
1835 establishments in Mexico